Serra de Daró is a municipality in Catalonia, Spain.  Documented since 1017, it is located in the Daró river valley.

References

External links
 Government data pages 

Municipalities in Baix Empordà
Populated places in Baix Empordà